KCRK-FM (92.1 FM) is a radio station licensed to Colville, Washington, United States.  The station is currently owned by North Country Broadcasting.

History of call letters
The call letters KCRK were previously assigned to an FM station in Cedar Rapids, Iowa, that began broadcasting November 16, 1947. It was owned by the Cedar Rapids Gazette newspaper and operated on 96.9 MHz.

References

External links

CRK-FM
Mainstream adult contemporary radio stations in the United States
Radio stations established in 1981